The 2004 Clipsal 500 was the sixth running of the Adelaide 500 race. Racing was held from Friday 18 March until Sunday 21 March 2004. The race was held for V8 Supercars and was the opening round of the 2004 V8 Supercar Championship Series.

Format
The format, unique to V8 Supercars and loosely similar to the Pukekohe 500 format, split the total distance of 500 kilometres into two separate 250 kilometre races each held on a different day. Points were assigned separately to the races, with more points allocated for Race 2 over Race 1, and they combined to award a round result.

Official results

Qualifying

Top Ten Shootout

Race 1

Race 2

References

External links
 Official race results
 Official V8 Supercar website

Adelaide 500
Clipsal 500
2000s in Adelaide